Mazlan bin Bujang is a Malaysian politician who served as Member of the Johor State Executive Council (EXCO) in the Pakatan Harapan (PH) and Barisan Nasional (BN) state administrations under Menteris Besar Osman Sapian and Hasni Mohammad from May 2018 to April 2019 and again from March 2020 to March 2022 as well as Member of the Johor State Legislative Assembly (MLA) for Puteri Wangsa from May 2018 to March 2022. He is an independent aligned with BN after leaving as a member, State Chairman of Johor and Division Chairman of Tebrau of the Malaysian United Indigenous Party (BERSATU), a component party of the Perikatan Nasional (PN) and previously PH coalitions.

Political career 
Mazlan contested for the Puteri Wangsa Johor state seat as PH and BERSATU candidate and went on to win the state seat in the 2018 state election. He was later appointed as an EXCO member in the new PH state administration by new Menteri Besar Osman Sapian. 

After Osman resigned as Johor Menteri Besar in April 2019, Osman also lost his position of State Chairman of BERSATU of Johor. Instead of new Menteri Besar Sahruddin Jamal who is also from BERSATU, Mazlan was instead appointed to the position even though he was not the Johor Menteri Besar. Sahruddin dropped and did not reappoint Mazlan as an EXCO member in his state administration after he took over as Johor Menteri Besar in April 2019.

President of BERSATU, Muhyiddin Yassin said there was no obstacle for those who did not serve as the Menteri Besar to be appointed to the position despite opposition from the Johor BERSATU division chairmen.

On 28 February 2020 during the Sheraton Move, PH and Sahruddin state administration collapsed and was replaced with the new BN state administration led by Menteri Besar Hasni Mohammad. He was reappointed back again as an EXCO member in the state administration. On 8 September 2020, Muhyiddin removed Mazlan from the position of the State Chairman of BERSATU of Johor and replaced him with Muhyiddin himself. 

On 20 January 2022, he announced ahead that he would not seek for reelection as a Johor MLA in the 2022 Johor state election. On 27 January 2022, he announced that he resigned as Division Chairman of BERSATU of Tebrau and himself as well as 23 Tebrau BERSATU branch chairmen and action committee members decided to leave the party and throw their support behind Barisan Nasional (BN) and the leadership of Menteri Besar of Johor Hasni Mohammad with immediate effect to "give way to a more stable political environment and for the betterment of the Johor people in general".

He also claimed that he would carry on to serve the people without a political position and failure of the two previous Menteris Besar from Pakatan Harapan (PH) to lead the Johor state administration and the failure of both parties to nominate a better Johor Menteri Besar candidate as well as he felt disrespected of his removal as Johor BERSATU Chairman and the action of Muhyiddin of not sending any representative to the meetings he had chaired even though Muhyiddin had signed his promotion letter as the reasons as well. Muhyiddin then lashed out at Mazlan by asking where is his honour and sarcastically asked him to bring 200000 members to leave BERSATU as well.

Election results

References 

Year of birth missing (living people)
Living people
People from Johor
Malaysian people of Malay descent
Malaysian Muslims
Independent politicians in Malaysia
Former Malaysian United Indigenous Party politicians
Members of the Johor State Legislative Assembly
Johor state executive councillors
21st-century Malaysian politicians